Looking at Long John is an album by Long John Baldry released in 1966. In 1995, Long John's Blues / Looking at Long John was released on CD. It has since been re-released and remastered on Looking at Long John: The UA Years. The orchestral arrangements were conducted by Bob Leaper; except "Turn On Your Love Light" which was by Charles Blackwell.

Track listing
 "You've Lost That Loving Feeling" (Barry Mann, Phil Spector, Cynthia Weil) – 3:22
 "Only a Fool Breaks His Own Heart" (Norman Bergen, Shelly Coburn) – 2:44
 "Make It Easy On Yourself" (Burt Bacharach, Hal David) – 2:58
 "Let Him Go (and Let Me Love You)" (Lockie Edwards Jr., Robert Maxwell) – 2:12
 "Drifter" (Richard Gottehrer, Bob Feldman, Jerry Goldstein) – 3:03
 "Cry Me a River" (Arthur Hamilton) – 3:01
 "Stop Her on Sight (S.O.S.)" (Richard Morris, Albert Hamilton, Charles Hatcher) – 1:56
 "Turn On Your Love Light" (Deadric Malone, Joseph Scott) – 2:07
 "I Love Paris" (Cole Porter) – 2:13
 'Keep on Running" (Jackie Edwards) – 2:16
 "Ain't Nothing You Can Do" (Deadric Malone, Joseph Scott) – 2:31
 "Bad Luck Soul" (Ann Martin, David Gussin) – 2:22

References

Long John Baldry albums
1966 albums
United Artists Records albums